The 2023 Israeli judicial reform is a proposed series of changes to the judicial system and the balance of powers in Israel put forward by the current Israeli government, and spearheaded by Deputy Prime Minister and Minister of Justice Yariv Levin and the Chair of the Knesset's Constitution, Law and Justice Committee, Simcha Rothman. It seeks to curb the judiciary's influence over lawmaking and public policy by limiting the Supreme Court's power to exercise judicial review, granting the government control over judicial appointments and limiting the authority of its legal advisors. If adopted, the reform would grant the Knesset the power to override Supreme Court rulings that deem legislation passed by the Knesset as unconstitutional, by reintroducing the legislation and approving it with a majority of Knesset Members. The reform would additionally diminish the ability of courts to conduct judicial review of the Basic Laws, and change the makeup of the Judicial Selection Committee so that a majority of its members are appointed by the government and effective control over the appointment of judges is given to the government.

Levin and the ruling government coalition have stated that the above is the first step in their judicial reform, and that additional steps are planned, including: changing the appointment process of legal advisors to government ministries, such that they are appointed and dismissed by the ministers; making their legal advice a recommendation rather than binding on the ministers; and making them subordinate directly to the ministers rather than to the Justice Ministry's professional oversight. Prime Minister Benjamin Netanyahu maintains that the reform is necessary because the judiciary has too much control over public policy, and a better balance is needed between democratically elected legislators and the judiciary. However, Netanyahu has been barred from actively taking part in the governmental process of the judicial reform by the Attorney General, due to a conflict of interest stemming from his ongoing trial.

The proposed reform has sparked significant backlash both inside and outside of Israel. Opposition leaders and activists accused the government of undermining established norms of checks and balances and attempting to seize absolute power, with some arguing the reform amounts to an attempt at regime change. The President of Israel, Isaac Herzog, has called for the reforms to be halted to allow for a wider consultative process, and the President of the Supreme Court of Israel and Israel's Attorney General have attested to the reform's illegalities.

Protests against the reform erupted in Israel shortly after its introduction, as did significant concern among some in the international community. On 12 February 2023, Herzog called on the government to cease pushing forward the legislation and to engage in dialogue and coordinated reform with the opposition, in an attempt to achieve consensus. The government rejected this proposal and bills advancing the reforms were passed for a first reading the next day, on 13 February 2023.

Simultaneously with the reforms curbing the powers of the civil judiciary, the government is progressing reforms to widen the authority of the Rabbinical Court, allowing them to act as arbitrators in civil matters using religious law, if both parties consent.

Background

Israeli Supreme Court and judicial review 
Under Israel's current constitutional framework, all legislation, government orders, and administrative actions of state bodies are subject to judicial review by the Supreme Court of Israel, which has the power to strike down legislation and reverse executive decisions it determines to be in violation of Israel's Basic Laws.

This role of the Court in Israel has been seen as crucial for the protection of human rights in light of its otherwise weak system of checks and balances, which lacks a bicameral legislative system, a president with executive powers, a federal government, regional elections, membership in a regional supra-governmental organization, or acceptance of the International Court of Justice's authority.

The exercise of these powers by the court has often sparked controversy within Israel, usually among right-wing politicians and their supporters. Many of the court's rulings, particularly those limiting the expansion of Israeli settlements in the disputed West Bank, as well as those affecting ultra-Orthodox autonomy and way of life have sparked resentment among ultra-Orthodox and Religious Zionist politicians, many of whom have accused the court of engaging in judicial activism in favor of left-wing causes.

1992 Constitutional Revolution and its discontents 

Between 1992 and 1999, Supreme Court Justice Aharon Barak developed a doctrine in a series of rulings, the guiding principle of which is the introduction of Human rights indirectly to private law. This is done with the help of concepts such as "good faith", "public policy" or "violation of legal duty" that the judges apply in their rulings. The proponents of judicial reform claim that the problem is that the concepts depend on the judge who interprets them, resulting in legal uncertainty, opening private and government action to judicial review according to the dictates of the judge's conscience and not necessarily according to the laws established by the legislature.

2018–2022 Israeli political crisis and 2022 legislative election 
Within the context of the 2018–2022 Israeli political crisis, the 2022 legislative election was the fifth Knesset election in nearly four years, as no party had been able to form a stable coalition government since 2019. In the election, the right-wing bloc won a majority of seats in the Knesset, with far-right elements such as the Religious Zionist Party making record-breaking gains.

Following the election, Likud leader and former Prime Minister Benjamin Netanyahu formed the thirty-seventh government of Israel, assigning many powerful positions in the new government to previously marginalized far-right politicians who had long advocated policies that conflicted with many of the supreme court's precedents and have sought to curtail its powers. Among the incoming government's official policy guidelines was a commitment to judicial reform.

Processes and functions affected by the proposed changes 
On 4 January 2023, newly-appointed Justice Minister Yariv Levin announced his intention to overhaul Israel's Judiciary. On 11 January, Levin published a draft of his proposed changes, which included the following changes to the judiciary, executive and legislative processes and functions:
 Judicial selection — The committee which is responsible for recommending the appointment of judges currently comprises of serving judges, representatives of the Israel Bar Association, Knesset members and government Ministers, and is composed as such that agreement is required between these different groups. The proposed changes seek to change the composition of the committee, giving a majority of votes to the government and thus giving the government control over the selection and dismissal of all judges, including of the Supreme Court.
 Judicial review — The proposed changes seek to curb judicial review over legislation, including by explicitly legislating against the Supreme Court's exercise of judicial review of Basic Laws, and requiring a full bench of Supreme Court justices to preside over any case in which the legality of regular legislation passed by the Knesset is evaluated, and 80% of them to rule for invalidation of such legislation.
 Knesset Override — The proposed changes seek to allow the Knesset to overrule a decision by the Supreme Court on the legality of legislation, where the Knesset votes with a majority (of 61, out of 120 Knesset members) against the court decision.
 Legal advisers to government ministries — The proposed changes seek to reclassify ministry legal advisers from independent authorities, subject to the professional oversight of the Justice Ministry, to politically selected counsel whose opinions are explicitly non-binding upon the government and its ministers, thus allowing ministers to individually select and dismiss their legal advisors and decide whether or not to adhere to legal advice.
 Reasonableness — The proposed changes seek to limit the scope of judicial review of governmental and administrative decisions, by legislating against the concept of 'reasonableness'. This would preclude the courts from hearing petitions or appeals against governmental and administrative decisions on the basis that such decisions are 'unreasonable'.

The proposed changes

Judicial selection

Current system 
The Judicial Selection Committee is composed of nine members. Three of them are Supreme Court judges, two are representatives of the Bar Association, two are Knesset members and two are ministers. Selection of judges to all courts require a simple majority of the Committee, but selection of Supreme Court judges require the approval of 7 out of the 9 members on the Committee, granting essentially veto powers to either the three judges or the representatives of the ruling Parliamentary coalition. According to the Israel Democracy Institute, the effect of the current system is one of consensus, in that "the selection of Supreme Court justices has mandated the consent of the politicians on the [Committee], because a majority of seven of its nine members must support a successful candidate. By the same token, the politicians cannot select judges without the agreement of the justices on the committee. This principle has generally produced a consensus on a slate of new justices." In contrast, those who view the current Supreme Court as left-leaning, including Minister of Justice Yariv Levin and Prime Minister Netanyahu, state that this 'consensus' is one-sided: When a right-wing government is in place, its members must compromise with the allegedly left-leaning committee members (the 3 Supreme Court justices and the Bar representatives who, it is claimed by Levin, vote as a block), but when a left-wing government is in charge, supposedly no such consensus is needed. They point to the recent appointment of 61 judges in one sitting of the committee, under the previous center-left government, with no effective way for the opposition to object.

Proposed system 
According to the amendments proposed to the Judiciary Basic Law by Justice Minister, Yariv Levin, the Judicial Selection Committee's composition will be changed to give greater weight to the legislative and executive branches of government. The Committee will consist of eleven members, namely the Minister of Justice who will serve as the Committee Chairman, two Ministers designated by the government, the Chairman of the Knesset Constitution, Law and Justice Committee, the Chairman of the Knesset State Control Committee, the Chairman of the Knesset Committee, the President of the Supreme Court, two other judges of the Supreme Court who will be chosen from their fellow judges, and two public representatives chosen by the Minister of Justice, one of them being a lawyer. As a result, since the committee chairmen are usually (though not always) selected from the ranks of the ruling coalition, the government could have complete control over the appointment and dismissal of judges, with seven representatives on the Committee out of eleven members in total.

Arguments in favor of the reform 
Arguments put forward to justify this change include the following:

 As things stand, members who are not publicly elected officials — the judges and lawyers — have a majority in the Committee, and it is impossible to appoint a judge of whom they do not approve to any judicature. Furthermore, it is alleged that the Supreme Court's representatives generally vote in a coordinated manner, and this causes the judiciary's representatives to negotiate with the other Committee members as one unit, with increased negotiating power.
 Comparatively, focusing exclusively on the Supreme Court, Israeli judicial selection is exceptional when contrasted with other democratic countries. A 2019 study of judicial appointments to constitutional courts of the 36 OECD countries (supreme courts or constitutional courts) found that 24 out of 36 countries surveyed appoint their judges in a system that grants the power to elected officials exclusively. For example, in the United States, supreme court judges are appointed by the president, with the confirmation of the Senate; in Germany, constitutional court judges are appointed by both chambers of the legislature; in France, the judges of the constitutional council are appointed by the President and both houses of representatives in equal proportion, and alongside them serve former state presidents; in Japan, the selection is controlled by the government subject to ratification through a referendum. This system of exclusive appointment of judges by the elected officials is common to Canada, Australia, New Zealand, Belgium, Switzerland, Austria, Ireland, the Netherlands, Denmark, Sweden, Iceland, Finland, Norway and more. It must be stated that in Israel, such a system was used during the state's early years and that the judges that established the Supreme Court were appointed by the government with the Knesset's approval.
 Only four OECD member states, besides Israel, appoint their constitutional court judges without giving the elected officials the ability to appoint the judges: Turkey, Greece, the UK and Luxembourg. However, the UK and Luxembourg are distinct from Israel and most other states in that their judges cannot void parliament's laws, and that the supremacy of the public's values are attained by legislative supremacy. From this, of the 36 OECD countries, Israel's sole companions in giving a veto to non-elected officials over judicial appointed to the highest tribunal authorized to strike down parliament's laws, are Greece and Turkey.
 Of the 50 states that comprise the United States, in 22 states, the supreme court judges are elected directly by voting ballot; in another 15 states, the appointments are ratified in a direct vote; four states elect their judges through the public officials and eight states appoint by committees in which the majority of the members are appointed by elected officials.

Arguments against the reform 
The Kohelet Policy Forum study used to underpin most of the above arguments has been strongly criticized as being selective in its reliance on foreign legal systems. For example:

 While 31 of the 36 countries in the study have public representatives selecting the judges, in 24 of them, judges are selected in consultation with the judicial system and upon its recommendation.
 Further, while in most of these countries such a recommendation carries no legal force, in practice it is binding, as the public representatives listen to the judges' recommendations and act upon them. As noted in a study, "the political culture in these countries is such that public representatives select the judges with the consent and blessing of the judicial system — a political culture completely different than that in Israel."
 The same study notes: "The other developed countries, in which there is no appreciable involvement of the justice system in judicial selection, are almost all countries with constitutions. Some have a federal structure of several states, each with its own additional supreme court protecting the residents of that federal state. Most have bicameral legislatures not necessarily controlled by the party controlling the executive branch, and so the government's power is decentralized. Usually judicial selection requires the consent of the government as well as both houses of parliament, and almost always the choice in the legislative chambers requires a large majority (usually two thirds of the votes, and even an absolute majority). In other words, the coalition, which does not rule alone and cannot appoint judges on its own, needs the consent of the opposition as well. None of this exists in Israel, and that completely changes the picture."
 The proposed changes would also grant the government complete control in appointing judges to all courts other than the Supreme Court. The justification for changing the manner of appointing judges to courts other than the Supreme Court is unclear.

In addition, the Knesset's Research Unit, in a survey, also presented a very different picture, quoting an OECD report arguing that on the purposes promoted by most democracies is to prevent any single power control over judicial appointment of constitutional court justices.

The Israeli Law Professors Forum for Democracy, comprising over 100 legal experts and academics in Israel, has published a number of position papers analyzing these reforms, concluding that their implementation would undermine the judiciary's "independence, subordinate the judiciary to the elected government, and render the separation of powers in Israel an empty shell".

According to Prof. Elise Brezis, director of the Azrieli Center for Economic Policy at Bar-Ilan University, the Kohelet Policy Forum did not attempt to assess the impact their plan will have on the Israeli economy. She compared the plan to a "pretty architectural sketch with no engineering assessment."

Government legal advisors 
The coalition has published a draft bill to reclassify ministry legal advisers from independent authorities to politically selected counsel whose opinions are explicitly non-binding upon the government and its ministers. The draft bill determines that "legal advice given to the government" or to "the prime minister and all government ministers, will not obligate it or be able to alter its legal position", and that the cabinet and its ministers are "authorized to reject legal advice and operate against it." This would substantially change the system which has been in place till today, whereby each ministry's legal adviser falls under the aegis of the Attorney General to preserve their independence from political influence, and their advice is binding upon ministries.

The immediate former Attorney General, Avichai Mendelblit, has formerly criticized past attempts to pass such laws, stating that "letting ministers appoint legal advisers — instead of the current system of election through public tender — would politicize the position and harm the integrity of Israeli democracy's 'gatekeepers.'"

Prof. Yedidia Stern, former dean of the Law Faculty at Bar-Ilan University, has criticized the bill, explaining that a public legal advisor has duties to both "the government ministry to which he is appointed, and the public. In addition to legal advice, an attorney in the public service is also responsible for safeguarding the rule of law, for the benefit of us all. This dual role justifies dual input — by the minister and by the Attorney General — in the selection of ministry legal advisors."

Dr. Guy Lurie, of the Israel Democracy Institute, has argued that "In order to safeguard the legality of government actions and prevent corruption, the legal advisors must be independent when issuing their legal opinions, and professionally subordinate to the Attorney General, rather than to the minister."

Constitutional review 
The reform proposes to codify the Supreme Court's power of judicial review, which to date has not been set in legislation. In the face of the absence of such legislation, following the 1992 passing of the Human Dignity and Liberty Basic Law the Supreme Court has delineated such power to itself, including in a landmark decision, the 1995 Mizrachi Bank decision, similar to the US Supreme Court's 1803 decision in Marbury v. Madison.

The bill approved by the Constitution, Law and Justice Committee on 13 February 2023, explicitly states "the non-justiciability of basic laws, stipulating that a [court] holding adjudication power by law, including the Supreme Court, will not address, directly or indirectly, a question regarding the validity of a basic law, and no ruling on such a matter will be valid."

The government has also proposed that if the Knesset passes a regular law that contradicts existing Basic Laws, it will not be considered automatically void, and only the Supreme Court, with a full quorum of all its judges (excluding those precluded from participating for over 30 days from the day that the matter is to be decided) can preside over the law's nullification. Proponents of the change argue that this is in order to guarantee a comprehensive discussion with the full range of views in the Supreme Court, as well as to prevent the discussion from being influenced by the supposed haphazard nature of the panel. It is further proposed that the majority needed to nullify a law is a majority of eighty percent of the total judges, with the argument being that the nullification of a law passed by an elected government should be exceptional (even if it contradicts existing Basic Laws), and if several judges do not decide to nullify the newer contradicting law, the will of the elected government should prevail.

The proposed legislation argues that as the Basic Laws are Israel's supreme legal norms, the Court derives its power of judicial review from the Basic Laws themselves and thus cannot review or strike down the Basic Laws themselves. The proposal seeks to deny judicial review over Basic Laws, in order to guarantee the Supreme Court's subjection to the rule of name and to the source of democratic authority.

Proponents of this change argue that this is similar to the majority of Western countries in which there is no judicial review over constitutional norms. The legal advisor to the Committee through which this reform is being progressed published an opinion stating he had found no precedent in any democratic country for judicial review over legislation to require a unanimous decision of every judge on the relevant court.

Override clause 
Another proposal is to allow the Knesset to reject the interpretation given by the Supreme Court to a Basic Law and to override a Supreme Court decision nullifying a law. According to the proposal, the Knesset will be able to, under specific conditions, override a judicial decision nullifying a law. Proponents argue that the proposed override clause is not to exempt the Knesset from its commitments to constitutional values, but rather to give the legislators the ability to decide differently than the court.

In one form of the proposal, it is proposed that should the Supreme Court nullify a law in full consensus of all judges, the Knesset shall not be able to pass an override law during its term. However, if the Supreme Court decision nullifying primary legislation was not taken in full consensus, it is proposed to allow the Knesset to override the Supreme Court decision nullifying the law with a majority of 61 Knesset members, as long as the law states explicitly that the law will be valid notwithstanding the Supreme Court's ruling. The override will remain valid for the term of the next Knesset, which may review it anew. As such, it is stated that the force of the override is limited to four years or until the end of the first year of the term of a new Knesset after the Knesset that passed the override law, according to the later event. This override model, in which there is no a priori override, allows a proper and useful dialogue between the branches, and for the Knesset to see the Court's detailed ruling before taking the exceptional step of override.

It is further proposed that the Knesset will be able to override the judgement to nullify a law given in full consensus. However, this is on condition that the Knesset that passes the override is a different Knesset than that which passed the nullified law, therefore expressing two Knessets' support for a different value framework than that of the Supreme Court. The fact that the public expresses its positions by means of general selections, that the matter pertains to a value judgement of two Knesset and that the negative incentive of immediate legislation is eliminated, justifies returning the final decision to the people and its representatives. In such a case, as well as in a case when a regular override is passed by two Knessets, the override will be permanent.

Proponents argue that similar clauses exist in Canada, Finland and the Australian state of Victoria. However, studies have pointed out the differences between Israel's system and these countries which affect the impact of such clauses on the political system. For example, a study conducted by Dr. Amichai Cohen of 66 democracies to identify and analyze the structural-formal restraints placed on the political branch concluded that "without granting the judicial branch the authority to oversee the other branches, Israel will become the sole democracy of significant size in which one elected authority wields practically unlimited power."

This proposal has been criticized for giving too much power to the Knesset, far beyond the power wielded by other executive and legislature bodies in Western countries. For example, the Israel Democracy Institute has stated that an "override clause would give a Knesset majority absolute power to enact laws, notwithstanding the stipulations of the Basic Laws. By doing so, it would severely curtail the Supreme Court's authority of constitutional review of laws passed by the Knesset, which is controlled by the Government (the executive branch) that enjoys a political majority. Every country has checks and balances that set limits on the power of the political majority. In Israel, however, the Supreme Court is the sole balancing mechanism."

Abolition of "unreasonableness" grounds

Arguments in favor of the reform 
The reform will abolish the use of "unreasonableness" as grounds for review of administrative decisions. Although unreasonablness has its origins in British jurisprudence, the court has expanded on this doctrine since Israel's founding in 1948. Some have claimed that the courts' definition of the grounds of reasonableness is unique globally. An unreasonable administrative action has been defined as a situation in which the administrative authority failed to give proper weight to all relevant considerations which formed the basis of the administrative decision, and did not properly balance between all the relevant considerations, in accordance with their weight:

This expansive doctrine empowers the Supreme Court to strike down almost any administrative decision, even if it was taken by due legal authority. In an interview with Haaretz, former Supreme Court Justice Moshe Landau criticized the use of the "unreasonableness" doctrine:

Arguments against the reform 
Dr. Amir Fuchs, a lecturer in the Politics and Communication Department at the School of Government and Social Sciences at Hadassah Academic College, has argued in favor of the reasonableness doctrine, saying that "its purpose is to prevent the government from passing entirely arbitrary decisions; but it is certainly not intended to replace the decision-making powers of the government, with those of the court. Like all other administrative law standards (the rules of natural justice, and standards such as the ban on extraneous interests and the requirement to take all relevant considerations into account), it is meant to ensure that the government does not exceed the boundaries of its law-given authority."

Prof. Yedidia Stern, former dean of the Law Faculty at Bar Ilan University, has defended the reasonableness doctrine, stating that without it, "the members of the outgoing Knesset will have the power to make the final decision about who can run against them in the next election. Without judicial review they will be able to protect one another through the mechanism of parliamentary immunity."

Ruvi Ziegler, the programme director for LLMs in International Law, Human Rights and Advanced Legal Studies at the University of Reading, has written that "the plan would strip courts of their power to hold the Executive properly accountable for its administrative decisions. This means decisions made by public authorities from the police to the tax authority, would no longer need to be considered "reasonable" to be accepted in judicial review. In practical terms this means anyone could be denied a license, a benefit, a service without being given suitable reasons and without having an effective remedy. The "reasonableness" standard, which is a key part of British legal heritage, is critical for good governance and must be maintained in the Israeli setting as well."

Status of the Attorney-General 
According to the Government Basic Law Amendment proposed by Knesset Member Simcha Rothman, the government and ministers will be authorized to determine its legal position in any matter. Furthermore, they will be entitled to accept or reject the Attorney-General's advice. Currently, according to Supreme Court rulings, the Attorney-General's legal opinion is considered to reflect, from the point of view of the government, the current legal status, as long as the court does not rule otherwise.

The government will also be entitled to determine its position that will be presented in court. The government will be entitled to private representation should the Attorney-General refuse to represent its position. Currently, if the Attorney-General refuses to defend the government's position or presents another position, the Attorney General may decline to defend the government's action in court, and if the division of opinions is based on a legitimate interpretative conflict, the Attorney General may grant the government recourse to different legal representation.

The position of binding advice and representational monopoly in Israel is exceptional and even unique by global standards. As Dr. Eitan Levontin describes, "there is no such thing, to the best of my understanding, in any other place. The legal situation in Israel is not a minority opinion, but rather a single opinion, and it seems to me that a chasm — not just a disagreement — lies between it and the legal situation in any comparable country." By contrast, in the UK, the US, Canada and Germany, the AG — or the parallel figure — is a political role similar to the minister, and in some countries is actually a government minister. As such, they have no power to bind the government to their positions; the government can act in oppositions to their positions; the government is authorized to dictate to the AG the position to present before courts; and he is forbidden to put together legal opinions absent government request.

The position of the Attorney General in Israel can only be understood against the background of the particular history of this position in Israel and against the background of Israel's regime, with its relatively weak system of checks and balances. For example, in a statement published by tens of Canadian legal experts, including former Supreme Court Chief Justice Beverley McLachlin and other former Justices of the Supreme Court, the differences between Israel and Canada's political systems were discussed, with the conclusion that "Israel's system of government differs from that of other democracies, like Canada's, in its exceptional concentration of political power. Other democracies have a suite of mechanisms that distribute or moderate the exercise of political power."

Opinion polls 
According to a poll published by the Israel Democracy Institute on 4 January 2023 "only 16 percent of Israelis [...] said that they believed that the number of politicians on the [Judicial Appointments Committee] should be increased, while 19 percent said that the current composition of the body was appropriate and a full quarter supported increasing the number of justices. A further 10 percent supported increasing the number of Bar Association representatives."

A survey published by the Israel Democracy Institute on 15 January 2023 "found that most Israelis, (55.6%), support the [Supreme Court] having the ability to strike down laws passed by the Knesset parliament if they contradict principles of democracy."

The Israel Democracy Institute's Israeli Voice Index published on 3 February 2023 showed that "The share of those who think that the reform to the justice system proposed by Minister of Justice Levin is quite bad or very bad (43%) is larger than that of those who think it is quite good or very good (31%)."

A poll commissioned by the Jewish People Policy Institute and published on 7 February 2023 revealed that "While 84% of Israelis believe the judicial system is in need of any change, only 22% support every change proposed in the reform." The same poll found 60% of respondents across all ages, backgrounds and from across the political spectrum believed the judicial reforms "would lead to violence" between the two conflicting camps.

A Channel 12 poll published on 10 February 2023 "indicated that over 60 percent of the public wants the government to halt or delay its legislative efforts to dramatically weaken the High Court of Justice and secure political control over judicial appointments."

A poll carried out by IDI's Viterbi Family Center for Public Opinion and Policy Research and published on 21 February 2023 found that only a quarter of respondent supported the proposed changes, and slightly over half of respondents felt the judicial reforms would harm Israel's economy. Further details of responses include:

 66% think the Supreme Court should have the power to strike down a law if it is incompatible with the Basic Laws.
 63% think that the current balance in the makeup of the Judicial Selection Committee should be maintained.
 58% oppose modifying the current method by which Ministry Legal Advisors are appointed.
 72% agreed there should be compromise negotiations between the conflicting parties to create consensus.

Domestic reactions 
The government's proposed reform of the judicial system has sparked intense controversy in Israel. Opposition leaders, activists, and prominent figures in the judiciary have harshly criticized the proposed changes, arguing they will undermine judicial independence and effectively grant the government unchecked power. They also accused Prime Minister Benjamin Netanyahu of seeking to weaken the judiciary due to his ongoing corruption trial. The following sub-sections include a selection of notable reactions.

Reaction of the President of Israel 
On 12 February 2023, the President of Israel, Isaac Herzog, gave a special address to the nation, stating that "the totality of the parts of the reform in its current form raise deep concerns about their potential negative impact on the democratic foundations of the State of Israel." The courts "safeguard society and the state" against crime and international prosecution of IDF soldiers, but also against the loss of "the fundamentals of justice, law and morality," he said. The President called for the legislative process regarding the judicial reforms to be halted, in order to arrive at a compromise based on a five-point plan presented during his speech. This proposal was rejected by the government and bills advancing the reforms were passed for first reading the next day, on 13 February 2023.

While the U.S. ambassador to Israel, Tom Nides, reacted positively to Herzog's speech, others referred to it as a "surrendering proposal". Nides tweeted straight after Herzog's speech, "Great speech tonight by a great leader". Some politicians from the ruling coalition delegitimized Herzog's and Nides "intervention" in political debate. On the other hand, prominent protesters and publicists referred to Herzog's speech as a "surrendering proposal", and claimed that democracy and human liberty are "not a matter of compromise". These critics emphasized that Herzog's proposal essentially keeps parliament's power to override the court's decisions, and that the current state of affairs is much more balanced.

In a televised address on 9 March 2023, President Herzog described the current crisis as "a national nightmare" and called on Prime Minister Netanyahu to immediately to halt the legislative process. "The legislation, as it is now […] is misguided, brutal and undermines our democratic foundations," he said. Herzog added that "Israel's democracy is the highest value. An independent judiciary is the highest value. Protecting human rights - of men and women, and minorities and maintaining the unique and rich Israeli mosaic - is the highest value."

Reactions from the Kohelet Policy Forum 
Many of the arguments supporting the proposed changes to the legal system are based on papers published by the Kohelet Policy Forum (see citations in section The proposed changes above). Nevertheless, some prominent members of that forum have criticised important aspects of the legislation.

While defending most of the changes the government is seeking to make to the judicial system, Moshe Koppel, the head of the Kohelet Policy Forum, whose work forms the basis of many of those changes, drew the line at the override clause, stating: "that should scare you. Most laws are not crazy, but every now and then there is a crazy law, and the same 61 people who voted for the crazy law … can then override the Supreme Court decision, and therefore, this is worrisome. This override is a dumb idea."

Michael Sarel, head of economics at Kohelet Policy Forum, has written that while he agrees that there are problems with the judicial system which need fixing, he does not support the government’s current proposals. His open letter states that "The separation of powers is one of the most important, most influential and most successful ideas in human history. The proposed reform will create a situation in which there will be no separation of powers, in that it subordinates the legal system to the will of the coalition. This proposal could be reasonable, and even very desirable, but only when at the same time there exists a powerful and independent court. Under the proposed reform, however, that will not be the situation." Sarel wrote that the planned reform gives almost unlimited power to a governing coalition, and that this is likely to lead to interference with the electoral process, for example by disqualifying parties and candidates and suppressing the media. "When there is no separation of powers and the coalition has almost unlimited power, it is reasonable to suppose that it will want to use that power to raise its chances of political survival.” He argued that "the temptation to take measures that will increase the chances of the parties making up the coalition to succeed in the next elections will be very strong and will be difficult to resist." Sarel added that “A democratic system in which […] there is no proper separation of powers will find it hard to survive for long as a democracy. It is no coincidence that the saying ‘all power tends to corrupt; absolute power corrupts absolutely’ has become a truism of political science."

Kohelet has removed position papers from its website, including proposals promoting the override clause, without announcing such deletions publicly.

Reactions opposing the changes

Public 

The proposed reforms have led to large-scale protests across Israel. According to organizers, on 11 February 2023, approximately 145,000 people protested in Tel Aviv, with another 83,000 in other areas across the country, including in Jerusalem, Haifa and the West Bank. On 13 February 2023, approximately 80,000 people protested in Jerusalem against the judicial reforms. Israel's centrist, centre-left, and left-wing opposition parties have organized the protests with grassroots activists. The protests were cited as examples of the political polarization that has been growing in Israel, and has increased during Netanyahu's sixth term as the Israeli Prime Minister.

Politicians 
Opposition Leader Yair Lapid has described the reform as a "unilateral revolution against the system of government in Israel" and urged his supporters to take to the streets to protest against it.

National Unity Party leader Benny Gantz said the reform would render Israel "democratically disabled" and urged his supporters to "go out en masse and to demonstrate" and to "make the country tremble".

Former Justice Minister Gideon Sa'ar wrote about "the damage that could be done to the rights and freedoms of citizens of Israel if the plan to demolish the judiciary goes ahead as planned." He concluded with "All those who love freedom, regardless of political leanings, must join together in the fight for Israel's future."

Vice Chairman of the World Zionist Organization Yizhar Hess has expressed strong opposition to the proposed reforms, describing them as "a shocking plan to fundamentally alter Israel's system of government."

Former Knesset member Yael German, who quit as Israel's ambassador to France following the swearing in of the current government, said: "I'll do whatever I can [...] to stop this disaster. I believe the future of democracy in our country is at stake."

Ronen Hoffman, Israel’s ambassador to Canada, resigned his post due to incompatibility with policies of the coalition government.

Asaf Zamir, Israel’s consul general in New York, criticized the plans to dramatically change Israel’s judicial system. "I'm deeply concerned about the direction the country is going in right now. If you want to have the national home and to be everyone's home, it really must be democratic," Zamir said.

Members of the legal profession

Supreme Court justices 
Chief Justice of the Supreme Court of Israel Ester Hayut said the reform would cause a "mortal wound" to judicial independence and would "deprive the court of the option to override laws that disproportionately violate human rights, including the right to life, property, freedom of movement, as well as the basic right of human dignity and its derivatives — the right to equality, freedom of speech and more."

A group of 18 former Supreme Court justices issued a statement warning against the coalition's plans, stating that the reforms "not only present a grave threat to the judicial system, but also the nature of the [political] system and way of life in Israel, in particular the possibility to fairly and efficiently protect the basic rights of every person. We see it as our duty to warn of this danger before it is realized." Separately, former Chief Justice of the Supreme Court Dorit Beinish has stated that the proposed changes would "destroy the court's independence." Also separately, former Supreme Court Justice Ayala Procaccia has described the proposed judicial reforms as "a danger both internally and to Israel's image in the world."

Attorneys general 
Attorney General of Israel Gali Baharav-Miara warned that the reform would "push democratic values to a corner" and that the proposed legislation would lead "to a governmental structure in which the executive and legislative branches have broad and, effectively, unlimited authority, with no structural solution to the possibility of abuse of power." She has issued an official opinion, stating that each of the provisions of the proposed judicial reforms would damage Israel's system of checks and balances on its own and more so cumulatively.

All seven living former Attorneys General (Aharon Barak, Yitzhak Zamir, Michael Ben-Yair, Elyakim Rubinstein, Menachem Mazuz, Yehuda Weinstein and Avichai Mandelblit) and four of the five former State Prosecutors (Dorit Beinisch, Edna Arbel, Eran Shendar and Moshe Lador) have published a letter saying "We were shocked to hear the plan … and we're convinced that it does not herald an improvement of the system, but threatens to destroy it." The letter continues to say that the plan "significantly limits the authority of the court to exercise effective criticism of the government so that it does not misuse its power and allows a coalition majority to legalize any act of the government, no matter how wrong and harmful it may be, through an override clause." The authors of the letter wrote that "the Supreme Court is a magnificent institution, one of the best that has arisen in Israel, and it is also recognized outside of Israel as one of the best courts in the world. In the absence of a constitution, and without a charter of human rights, it is the one that ruled in Israel the rule of law even towards system of government, fight arbitrariness and governmental corruption, and protect human rights and minority groups."

The previous Attorney General, Avichai Mendelblit, who was appointed as Cabinet Secretary and then Attorney General by Netanyahu, has described the government's proposed sweeping and drastic overhaul of the legal and judicial system as "regime change" that would "eliminate the independence of Israel's legal system from end to end." Mandelblit also accused Prime Minister Netanyahu of advancing the overhaul in order to bring his ongoing criminal trial to a premature end. In response, Knesset Member Simcha Rothman, who is spearheading some of the reforms, called for the jailing of Avichai Mandelblit for "incitement."

Others 
Israel Bar Association president Avi Himi has called on all Israelis to fight against the proposed reforms, saying "I expect all of them to understand that this war is the most important we've had in the country's 75 years of existence, and therefore I call on all of them to join."

198 senior faculty members at law schools in Israel issued a statement saying "We [...] strongly oppose the regime change that the Israeli government is promoting under the guise of 'legal reforms'. These far-reaching constitutional changes include providing the government with absolute control over the appointment of the judiciary; near complete elimination of judicial review; dissolution of civil-servant ministerial legal counsels as gatekeepers; and undermining the freedom of the press. In aggregation, these proposals suffocate the independence of the judiciary, dissolve the separation of powers between the branches of governments, and eliminate the rule of law. No recognized democratic country in the world operates under such conditions. The combination of the proposed changes is alarming and dangerous. It will bring far-reaching infringements of human rights, and strip Israel's system of government of fundamental features of its structure as a democracy."

17 top law firms in Israel published a joint statement against the reforms, warning against "harming the resilience and independence of the justice system and the system of checks and balances at the basis of the democratic regime we are so proud of, alongside the State of Israel being a Jewish state."

Prof. Yifat Bitton said of the reform that "the [legal] protections for women were created over the years by the High Court of Justice... this reform uniquely touches on our lives as women, especially when the ability to appeal to the HCJ on decisions... will grow narrower."

Prominent civil servants 
50 former director generals of government ministries published a statement that the planned overhaul "will cause unprecedented damage to Israel's economy." The signatories include former Ministry of Finance directors general, the former budget director at the Ministry of Finance Shaul Meridor, the former Prime Minister's Office director general Raanan Dinur, the former Ministry of Energy director general Udi Adiri, and the former Competition Authority director general Michal Halperin.

Alon Ushpiz, the retiring director general of the Ministry of Foreign Affairs, commented that "the state of Israel and its foreign policy need a strong and independent judiciary. We have a strategic, structural interest in this."

Members, reservists and retirees of the security services

Statements of concern by officers and commanders 
Former Defense Minister Moshe Ya’alon said: “This is the most important war in my life. We’re in the midst of a legislative process which is like a D9 armored bulldozer that overruns the judiciary. It’s clear that this is a coup. We’re in an economic crisis, and we’ll soon enter a security crisis.”

A group of former national security advisers, including several appointed by Netanyahu, warned in an open letter that the intensity of the current "social and political conflict is endangering national resilience." They said it was therefore incumbent upon coalition and opposition leaders to hold "serious dialogue without pre-existing conditions… to reach an agreed-upon framework regarding the relations between the legislative, executive and judicial branches." The letter was signed by the majority of national security advisers since the post was created in 1999 (during Netanyahu's first stint as premier). Among them are several Netanyahu appointees, including Uzi Arad, Yaakov Amidror, Yaakov Nagel and Yossi Cohen.

More than 400 ex-senior security officials, including former heads of the Israel Police, the Shin Bet and the Mossad, published a letter through the Commanders for Israel's Security group urging Israel's President not to sign any laws that contradict Israel's core democratic values as part of his efforts to mediate a compromise version of the government's judicial overhaul plan. The letter addressed to the President stated that the proposed changes pose real dangers for Israel's resilience, "it's standing among nations, its security, economy, and its unique connection to the Jewish people in the Diaspora." The rush of legislation is a "legal coup that will cause a tragedy for future generations."

Yuval Diskin, former head of the Shin Bet, wrote in an op-ed that the plan to weaken the independence of the judicial system would be "disastrous" if passed. He argued that "a true and strong democracy is our strongest weapon in our tough Middle Eastern neighborhood".

Former Israel Defense Forces chief of staff Dan Halutz claims that Israelis will not want to serve in the military if the government moves ahead with its judicial plans, stating that "draft dodging in a democracy is one thing, and draft dodging in a dictatorship is another. I think that soldiers and officers who recognize that there is a dictatorship here, will not want to become mercenaries of a dictator".

Former Mossad chief Tamir Pardo declared that Prime Minister Benjamin Netanyahu must resign for the good of the country and that every Israeli citizen should go out to protest.

Yoram Cohen, former head of the Shin Bet, has said that the government's judicial reform will "turn Israel from a democratic country to one which is not democratic. The goal of this reform is not to improve the judicial system, but to neutralize it." He added that "without a formal constitution the Supreme Court is the last beacon to defend rights in Israel."

Nadav Argaman, another former head of the Shin Bet, stated that "the great fear is that if these laws pass, then the State of Israel stands on the verge of dictatorship. And when it... [does], we could see a dissolution of the [security] organizations, of the system... There are people who would not be willing to serve in a situation where Israel a dictatorship, [and] then you don't need much for the system to cave into itself." He continued: "we ought not minimize it. It's a regime change, it's a coup, legally turning Israel into a dictatorship."

Roni Alsheich, former police chief and deputy head of the Shin Bet, stated that "The polls show a huge shift in public opinion toward a firm opposition to the judiciary overhaul. Right-wing and religious people like myself refuse to be enslaved to the brainwashing."

In a letter to Prime Minister Netanyahu and Defense Minister Yoav Gallant, all ten living former commanders of the Israeli Air Force (Amikam Norkin, Amir Eshel, Ido Nehustan, Eliezer Shkedi, Dan Halutz, Eitan Ben Eliahu, Herzl Bodinger, Avihai Ben Nun, David Ivri and Dan Tolkovsky) called on the Prime Minister to halt all legislation forming part of the judicial reform and to "find a solution to the situation as soon as possible.” The letter said the retired commanders "are following with deep worry the processes taking place ... and are fearful of these processes and the severe and concrete danger to national security.”

"Israeli President Isaac Herzog must take immediate steps to convene a constitutional assembly to protect Israeli democracy", a number of retired heads of the country’s security services urged in a joint letter. The signatories included former Prime Minister and Israel Defense Forces Chief of Staff Ehud Barak, and former Chiefs of Staff Moshe Ya'alon and Dan Halutz; former Shin Bet chiefs Nadav Argaman, Yuval Diskin, Carmi Gilon and Yaakov Peri; former Mossad chief Tamir Pardo; and National Security Adviser Uzi Arad. The government’s moves to undermine the independence of Israel's judiciary constitute a “coup d’état” that threatens to “turn Israel into a de facto dictatorship", they warned. Pardo was also a signatory of a petition by hundreds of Mossad veterans, including other former heads Nahum Admoni, Shabtai Shavit, Danny Yatom and Efraim Halevy, calling on the Knesset to "watch the separation of powers and the values of democracy".

One of the first members of the Palmach, the strike force of the Haganah pre-state militia, has pledged to combat the government’s attempt to weaken the country’s judiciary, stating that he feels obligated “to protect the precious country we founded.” 98-year-old Maj. Gen. (res.) Amos Horev was photographed at a protest rally carrying a sign stating “I was one of the first Palmach [members and] I will fight for the defense of our state.” During his long career, Horev served as the IDF Chief Armaments Officer and, later, was president of the Israel Institute of Technology.

Statements by reservists 

A brigadier general in the Israeli Air Force (IAF) reserves has asked to be discharged from service on moral grounds.

Dozens of reservists in the IDF Intelligence Corps special operations formation, including some in the rank of Colonel and Lieutenant colonel, have signed a petition stating they will no longer volunteer for service. According to the petition, "service under the special operations directorate requires complete alignment with the State's values, and fearless freedom of thought — things that will disappear if we become a dictatorship". The same day, it was a reported that a group of Mossad officers had asked, and received permission to participate in protests.

Dozens of reservists from the IDF Intelligence Corps research department have signed a letter to the government, stating that "if this dangerous legislation is passed, we will cease volunteering for reserve service".

A group of 300 reservists in the IDF Intelligence Corps Unit 8200 published an open letter to the government, warning against the legislation and its effect on the "integrity and security of the State of Israel... the disintegration of social cohesion, damage to Israeli economy, its stability and its image", and stating that they would cease volunteering for reserve service if it passes.

About 150 Israeli army reservists who serve as cyber specialists have announced that they will stop reporting for duty if the judicial overhaul is advanced. They explained that as their service "requires the development and operation of capabilities that have the potential of misuse, the legitimacy to operate them is only backed up by the condition of Israel being a liberal and democratic country that has a strong and independent judicial system that allows a balance between the branches. A regime that has no judicial oversight, may use these capabilities immorally and in a way that is contradictory to democratic values."

The overwhelming majority of reserve pilots in the IAF 69 Squadron notified their commanding officers in the Israeli Air Force that they will not be participating in a training exercise scheduled for the following week in protest at the changes the government is making to the judicial system. Squadron 69 is one of the air forces' leading units, operating advanced F-15 Thunder aircraft that serve as the army's long-range attack arm. The protesting pilots attended their base on the scheduled day but, instead of training, held a discussion about democracy and protest with the base commander. Tami Arad, widow of fallen IAF weapon systems officer Ron Arad offered her support for the 69 Squadron reservists.

Over 200 Israeli reservist military doctors have signed a letter, demanding that the government halt the legislative agenda "immediately and without pre-conditions." The doctors announced that they will no longer show up for reserve duty unless they can trust that the "government is acting from within the boundaries of a broad democratic national consensus whilst maintaining the democratic and egalitarian character of the state of Israel," which they feel should preserve "basic values" like "separation of powers, an independent judiciary and a sound legal framework to protect individual rights."

These events have raised concerns within the IDF. According to one veteran, a Lieutenant colonel, "if theses laws end up passing, the danger to Israel's security would increase tenfold because entire formations will disengage from the military. If anyone thinks they can carry out a legal coup without paying a price, they just don't understand what's happening in the trenches."

Retired members of Sayeret Matkal who served under Yonatan Netanyahu, Benjamin Netanyahu's brother, in Operation Entebbe, published a strong rebuke of the Prime Minister and his son.

After President Herzog’s compromise proposal of 15 March was rejected by the governing coalition, 100 officers from a classified Israeli Air Force unit, including two former Air Force chiefs, issued a letter, in which they wrote that "in the face of the constitutional situation developing in front of our eyes, which includes the demise of Israeli democracy as we know it, we fear that following military orders would be a violation of our oath, our conscience and our mission." A former commander of the special air force unit said: "This is a small unit. We never thought in our wildest nightmares that the greatest threat to Israel's survival as a Jewish and democratic country will be internal rather than an external enemy. Now that it is happening, we are determined to prevent it." He added "now that the President's proposal was rebuffed so rudely, we have lost what little faith we still had and decided to take steps. I think there is a strong chance this group will not follow the orders of an undemocratic regime."

Israel Atomic Energy Commission staff 
Almost 100 former managers and supervisors from Israel Atomic Energy Commission facilities, including the Dimona nuclear center, have issued a statement, opposing the proposed judicial changes. The signatories include two recent chiefs of Dimona, Maj. Gen. (ret.) Udi Adam and Dr. Udi Netzer.

Economists and financial experts 
Amir Yaron, the governor of the Bank of Israel, has stated that it is "imperative" to maintain the independence of the judiciary. He added that the planned changes to the judicial system could undermine investment and spark an exodus of educated Israelis.

Two former Bank of Israel governors, Karnit Flug and Jacob Frenkel, published an op-ed stating that the reforms could negatively affect Israel's credit rating and "deal a severe blow to the economy and its citizens." "Meticulous observance of the principle of separation of powers (the legislative, executive and judicial branches) is an iron principle upon which democracy is built and relies," they wrote, asserting that "although there is broad support for the need for certain changes to the judicial system, the set of suggested steps entails significant risks to the nature of democratic government in Israel and its image in the world."

Nobel Prize laureate Prof. Daniel Kahneman stated that "the reform is a disaster, not only in terms of values. It will have tangible results in the economy, in Israel's political status and ultimately in its security as well."

In early February, top Israeli bankers, including ones from Bank Hapoalim, Bank Mizrahi, and the First International Bank of Israel told Finance Minister Bezalel Smotrich that investors were withdrawing funds from Israel "at a rate ten times higher than usual", the shekel was showing weakness, and the Israeli stock market was declining compared to other exchanges. Uri Levin, the chief executive officer of Israel Discount Bank, said "There are negative indications and Israel's risk factor is rising."

In mid February 2023, Ynet News reported that "about 50 companies," predominantly from the tech sector, withdrew funds from Israel, and over $4 billion was moved out of Israel over a span of three weeks.

On 21 February 2023, Bank of Israel Deputy Governor Andrew Abir reported that the shekel was being harmed by "political uncertainty." That same day, the shekel declined to its weakest level since March 2020, falling more than 2% to a three-year low.

In response to a question from the Minister of Economy, Nir Barkat, about the possible danger to Israel economy due to the reform, the Chief Economist at the Ministry of Finance, Shira Greenberg, warned against an economic "snowball effect" that will cause severe damage to the economy. Bank of Israel Governor Amir Yaron similarly warned against a sudden economic shift that will cause "severe damage to the Israel economy that will be very hard to stop".

The widely predicted decline in the shekel came after national and foreign investors offered numerous warnings about the impact of the judicial reform, with IBI Investment House chief economist Rafi Gozlan saying, "Should the proposed judicial changes be fully passed this is very worrying as Israel is going to have a very different economy from where we are now with a strong government and no separation of institutional power."

200 former staffers of the Ministry of Finance, including former directors general Keren Terner-Eyal, David Brodet, Yarom Ariav and Yael Andorn, and former heads of the Budgets Division Shaul Meridor, Ori Yogev, Gal Hershkovitz and Udi Nissan, signed a letter calling on Smotrich to "act to halt immediately the rapid legislative process for changing the form of government in Israel, because of the grave fear of irreversible damage to the Israeli economy and to the social fabric in Israel."

Investors and entrepreneurs 
As a result of uncertainty and a significant amount of tech sector opposition to the proposed policies, the Israeli tech sector warned in January 2023 that firms may begin withdrawing money from Israel. On 26 January 2023, the firms Papaya Global and Disruptive AI withdrew their funds from the country, citing their decision as "a painful but necessary business step."  On 1 February 2023, the CEO of Verbit, Tom Livne, stated that he will leave Israel and has started withholding investments in Israel. On 7 February 2023, two more firms, Wiz and Skai.io announced that they plan to withdraw their funds from Israel.

Executives of Israel's retail banks also issued warnings to the government based on their observations of movement of money outside of Israel following the reform's announcement. According to news reports, "Bank Hapoalim CEO Dov Kotler told Netanyahu that banks have started to see an outflow of funds in recent days, with various savings accounts being moved from Israel abroad. Israel Discount Bank CEO Uri Levin said: "It's impossible to ignore all the economic figures expressing so much concern over the moves, and therefore you need to stop immediately and only advance changes cautiously and with broad agreement."

Leo Bakman, the president and one of the founders of the Israel Institute for Innovation, a nonprofit organization that serves as an incubator for 2,500 startups has said "If I thought this [judicial] 'reform' was like shooting oneself in the foot, I would probably think twice about speaking out. But I believe that we are shooting ourselves in the head."

Alon Nisim Cohen, founder of high-tech company CyberArk has said that he "sees a great danger to democracy, a danger to my beloved country, a danger to everything that is true to me." Cohen, whose company is valued at six billion dollars, said that he now "sees my life's work, the Israeli high-tech industry, in great danger. If, God forbid, they succeed in carrying out the coup and undermine democracy, this magnificent Israeli locomotive that was built for 30 years may to go off the rails very quickly. Investors are looking for stability. No big investor will invest his money in a dictatorial regime, even foreign money that is already here will flee to more stable places." Cohen added that "the economy is just the beginning. Once the dam bursts, nothing is immune anymore."

CEO of Pitango, Chemi Peres, warned the Knesset in late February that "huge companies want to get their money out of Israel" and that "this is legislation that is dangerous to the economy and the government has chosen to shut its ears."

In an investor conference that took place on February 15, a series of institutional investment fund executives warned against financial instability and the effect it will have on public savings.

Serial technology entrepreneur Benny Schneider warned against the move, highlighting the effects it would have on Israelis considering repatriation, on foreign investment, and on intellectual property.

Israeli cybersecurity company Riskified stated in an email to employees that it will transfer all of its cash and cash equivalents in Israel, totaling some USD 500 million, abroad. It also stated that it will support employees wishing to relocate to Lisbon, where the company maintains a research and development center.

Academic researchers 
Almost 300 academic researchers in the fields of International Relations, Political Science, and Game Theory have signed a petition against the changes, calling on the government "to maintain the strength of its judiciary and other institutions that are essential for a strong democracy to thrive, especially in the current international context."

Historians 
Prof. Daniel Blatman, of the Institute for Contemporary Jewry at the Hebrew University of Jerusalem, when asked about the proposed judicial reforms, said that "In a democracy, a stable and independent legal system is the foundation of all public, economic, social and political activity. [...] If these judicial 'reforms' are implemented, in a reality as complex as that of Israel, it will lead to disaster."

Prof. Yuval Noah Harari, of the Department of History at the Hebrew University of Jerusalem, wrote regarding any new judicial system: "[W]e must keep asking: 'What limits will there be on the power of the government under the new regime?' Let’s say that the governing coalition decides to pass a law depriving Arabs of the right to vote – does any mechanism exist that can obstruct such a move? In other democracies, there are many mechanisms that can prevent the passage of such a racist and antidemocratic law. In Israel, at present, there is only one such mechanism: the Supreme Court. If a majority of Knesset members votes in favor of disenfranchising Arabs, or in favor of denying workers the right to strike, or in favor of closing down all the newspapers that dare to criticize the government – the Supreme Court is the only institution authorized to intervene and strike down such legislation. How will we know that […] it’s time to stop demonstrating and consider a compromise? […] [T]he key question each one of us will have to ask ourselves regarding any such arrangement is: 'What will limit the power of the government? If a majority of Knesset members wants to deprive Arabs of the right to vote, or ban all opposition newspapers, or jail women for wearing shorts – what is the mechanism that will prevent this?'"

Others 
Nasreen Haddad Haj-Yahya, a partner at The Portland Trust, said that "if judges with a right-leaning world view are appointed, the harm to Arab women will be much greater than to other groups. A liberal woman from Tel Aviv has many more options... than a disenfranchised woman living in the Arab, patriarchal, traditional society in the countryside... this is also true of other disenfranchised groups in Israeli society, such as Ethiopian and [Jewish] Orthodox women...".

Yael Sherer, director of the Lobby to Combat Sexual Violence, commented that much of the medical and psychological treatment of victims of sexual violence is grounded in reasonableness: "if I appeal to the HJC today, then it can force the state [to provide care] thanks to the National Health Insurance Law that has the word 'reasonable' in it. But if we abolish reasonableness then there's no standard [of care] that is reasonable, the law is emptied of meaning, and the entire medical service will worsen at once."

Dr. Rani Barnea, head of the Stroke Prevention Center at Beilinson Hospital, wrote an op-ed detailing the potential effects the reform would have on the medical system. According to Barnea, the reform could negatively affect patients' ability to exercise their right to healthcare; the professional independence of the medical system; the quality of medical training and treatment; and academic freedom and scientific research. Barnea also raised his concern about the impact the changes will have on the weakest members of society, such as the elderly, the disabled, inmates and refugees, as well as women.

Assaf Sagiv, former editor-in-chief of Azure, the leading periodical of the right, said in an interview: "[this] is what we can expect if the proposed reform is implemented: the dismantlement of the state’s institutions, splitting the spoils between party bosses who are battling one another for power and resources, loss of public security, looting of the public coffers and deterioration into general lawlessness."

Miriam Adelson, the publisher of Israel Hayom, wrote an article saying that "Regardless of the substance of the reforms, the government's dash to ratify them is naturally suspect, raising questions about the root objectives and concern that this is a hasty, injudicious, and irresponsible move."

The National Council for Research and Development, operating under the auspices of the Ministry of Science and Technology, sent a letter to minister Ofir Akunis warning against the detrimental effects of the reform on Israel's scientific research activities.

Journalist Ilana Dayan warned against the harm the legislation will cause to "gays, women, Arabs, reporters, lecturers, the poor, and later Haredim and others". Commenting on the proposed changes, she stated that "a regime [that wishes to make these changes] takes us to a place that no democracy has ever come from alive. A regime does not grab this amount of power just for show." She admitted that errors have been made by former Supreme Court President Aharon Barak and the HJC, but stated that "there's nothing in this 'reform' that will address them. It [does have] the absorption of great, ultimate power into just one place."

About 1,000 Israeli cultural figures, including David Grossman, Nurit Zarchi and Ilana Bernstein, have signed a letter, stating that Israel "is currently facing a most terrible crisis… [where the] elected government [is attempting] to turn it from a flourishing democracy into a theocratic dictatorship."

Reactions partially supporting the changes 
Former Supreme Court Justice Jacob Turkel initially expressed limited support for the reforms in a radio interview. He said: "I wouldn't change anything in the (proposed) legislation. I would pass the reform and see how it works... I don't think that there is any danger to democracy. Things need to be done cautiously and we'll hope for the best." However, Turkel expressed disagreement with the details of the reform, stating that the proposed majority for overriding the Supreme Court needs to be larger, and that the concept of "reasonableness" should not be removed entirely from the Court's remit. Turkel subsequently signed the statement published by 18 former Supreme Court judges, opposing the reforms.

Former Justice Minister Daniel Friedmann also expressed partial support for the reforms.

Reactions fully supporting the changes 
Berachyahu Lifshitz, the former Dean of the Hebrew University faculty of law, wrote that the scaremongering about the end of democracy promulgated by opponents of the reform is overblown and that history shows that  Israel was a vibrant democracy before the changes of the 90s that the current reform seeks to undo, and will continue to be one if the reform passes.

International reactions

Reactions opposing the changes

Jewish organizations

Australia 
The Executive Council of Australian Jewry and the Zionist Federation of Australia issued a joint statement saying "[We] express our serious concern at the governing coalition’s proposals to make fundamental changes to the relationship between the Knesset and the judiciary with undue haste and in the absence of broad-based public support. [...] We call on the governing coalition to heed the call from Israeli President Isaac Herzog for genuine dialogue, based on his five principles for judicial reform, and to pause all of these controversial proposals so that constructive dialogue can occur and a national consensus can begin to emerge."

North America

Union for Reform Judaism 
The Union for Reform Judaism has condemned the proposed judicial reforms, stating that "If implemented, these reforms will dramatically weaken Israel's democracy, eviscerating any meaningful checks and balances that provide a separation of powers — a backbone of secure democracies." Their statement went on to say "Because Israel has no constitution, no bill of rights, and no second parliamentary chamber, the High Court is the only check and balance in existence. Once these "reforms" are instituted, the people in power need never relinquish it. There will be no other branch of government to rein them in. […] The Government of Israel and Jewish organizations around the world should heed carefully the urgent warnings of Israeli judicial experts such as former Supreme Court Justice and former Attorney General Menachem Mazuz, who recently stated: 'I don't know of anything in the literature of political science that will enable a country [with a separation of powers as delineated by [Minister] Levin's plan] to be considered a democracy.... in such a reality, effectively in Israel the only body that can rein in a tyranny of the majority is the judicial system. This restrictive power, they want to annul.' The statement ended with a "call on Minister Levin to withdraw his proposal, and on all lawmakers to unequivocally reject it."

Rabbi Rick Jacobs, president of the Union for Reform Judaism, said that Diaspora Jews were "deeply concerned" about proposed changes to Israel’s democracy. "With only 61 votes the Knesset could override the rights of millions such as the LGBTQ community, women, Palestinians citizens of Israel and non-Orthodox Jews," he said. "We know how precarious it can be to live as a minority. But we also know that our concepts of equal rights for all, our rule of law, our independent courts — our democracy — is what protect us."

Masorti/Conservative Judaism movement 
Representatives of the global Masorti/Conservative Judaism movement have backed Israel's President Isaac Herzog's call to suspend pending legislation to overhaul the Israeli judicial system and to organize a national dialogue in order to "identify a better path forward that guarantees the rights of all Israelis and preserves the State of Israel as the Jewish and democratic nation-state of the Jewish people around the world." They expressed their "grave concern" that legislation to allow the Knesset to overturn High Court rulings invalidating laws would "eviscerate the already fragile balance of power between the branches of Israel's government." Among those who signed the letter were the Rabbinical Assembly, an international association of Conservative rabbis; Masorti Israel, the movement's Israeli arm; and the Jewish Theological Seminary, the flagship Conservative educational institution. "Weakening Israel's highly-regarded judicial system would undermine the message we have proudly and successfully promoted for decades around the world that Israel is both a Jewish AND a democratic state," the groups stated. "With the mounting global disapproval of the proposed plan, moving forward risks serious economic, diplomatic and strategic consequences," they stated. "We call on all Jews worldwide to join us in making our voices heard at this historic juncture for Israel and the Jewish people as a whole."

Jewish Federations of North America 
The Jewish Federations of North America have released a letter addressed to Prime Minister Benjamin Netanyahu and opposition head Yair Lapid, urging negotiations on the judicial overhaul plan, and stating "We urge you to make clear that a majority of just sixty-one votes of the Knesset is not sufficient to override a decision of the Supreme Court. The essence of democracy is both majority rule and protection of minority rights."

National Council of Jewish Women 
The National Council of Jewish Women has issued a statement saying that "A fair and qualified judiciary is a crucial element of a healthy democracy where women, children, and families can thrive. But proposals from the new Israeli government seek to override the powers of Israel's Supreme Court to review governmental actions and Knesset legislation and increase governmental influence over judicial appointments. Such an overhaul […] threatens the dignity, equity and justice of everyone in the region." The statement adds "Without a strong, independent and impartial judiciary, women, children and families across the spectrum of Israeli society are likely to suffer dire consequences."

Others 
Over 200 American Jewish leaders have signed a statement expressing their "concern that the new government's direction mirrors anti-democratic trends that [they] see arising elsewhere [...] rather than reinforcing the shared democratic values that are foundational to the U.S.-Israel relationship." Their statement continues "We are, for example, concerned about the Israeli Justice Minister's plan to limit the Supreme Court's power [...]."

The former director of the Anti-Defamation League Abraham Foxman has said that "it is critical that this new government not [...] tamper with Israel's democracy, its institutions, its legal systems, its civil rights of Arab minorities [...]."

United Kingdom 
Thirteen Jewish organizations active in the UK have launched a campaign called Choose Democracy, asking members of the Jewish diaspora to add their names to a statement saying "We cannot be silent as Israel's new government seeks to [...] Undermine the rule of law and curtail human rights [...]". The sponsoring organizations are Arzenu UK, Habonim Dror UK, Jewish Labour Movement, Liberal Judaism, LJY-Netzer, Masorti Judaism, Meretz UK, Movement for Reform Judaism, New Israel Fund, Noam Masorti Youth, RSY-Netzer, Union of Jewish Students and Yachad. The statement has collected over 2,000 signatures.

The United Jewish Israel Appeal has stated that the UJIA remains committed to the values that have always informed its work with Israel but added "We are profoundly concerned that recent proposals to weaken the independence of Israel’s judiciary together with actions and statements from members of the current Israeli government are undermining these values."

Politicians

Germany 
Steffen Seibert, the German ambassador to Israel, said that Germany believes an independent justice system is a tenet of democracy and is closely watching the Israeli dispute over a government plan for judicial change. "Democracy is more than the temporary power of the democratically elected majority," Seibert said. "It is also about the preservation of the rights of minorities, and it is also about the proper balance of power and that's where an independent judiciary comes in," said Seibert, adding that Germany was closely watching the fierce debate.

German foreign minister Annalena Baerbock said "... we abroad are concerned about some of the legislative plans in Israel. Among the values that unite us is the protection of constitutional principles such as the independence of the judiciary."

United Kingdom 
Margaret Hodge MP, the parliamentary chair of the Jewish Labour Movement, wrote that "Netanyahu’s government plans to undermine judicial independence by instituting the political appointment of judges and introducing a new 'overriding' clause, allowing any decision by the supreme court of Israel to be overridden by a simple majority vote in the Knesset. This would destroy the independence of the judiciary. This is especially damaging because Israel does not have a written constitution and depends on its basic laws, upheld by an independent judiciary, to protect fundamental rights."

United States

President 
President Joe Biden wrote "The genius of American democracy and Israeli democracy is that they are both built on strong institutions, on checks and balances, on an independent judiciary. Building consensus for fundamental changes is really important to ensure that the people buy into them so they can be sustained."

Senators 
Senator Dick Durbin, the chairman of the Senate Judiciary Committee, has said that he is concerned that Netanyahu is "dangerously putting his own narrow political and legal interests — and those of the troubling extremists in his coalition — ahead of the long-term interests and needs of Israel's democracy."

Senator Ben Cardin, the second-ranking Democrat on the Senate Foreign Relations Committee, has said "I am fearful for the future of democracy in Israel as the right-wing Netanyahu government threatens to undermine the essential checks-and-balances that make democracies work. I urge the prime minister and his cabinet to listen to President Isaac Herzog and the hundreds of thousands of Israelis who have taken to the streets in peaceful protest to protect the independence of the judiciary." Cardin continued, "If Mr. Netanyahu wants to demonstrate real strength and courage, I implore him to not turn his country away from democracy but return to the roots and values that have made his country flourish and grow. There is still time to correct course and put the long-term health of Israeli democracy over short-term personal power."

Senator Chris Van Hollen is worried about the legislation's implications. "An independent judiciary is a key hallmark of any democracy and serves as a safeguard of the people's rights and freedoms," he says. "That's why the Netanyahu government's actions to undermine the independence of the Israeli judicial branch are especially concerning."

Senator Tim Kaine said that "As tens of thousands of Israelis rally in support of democracy and judicial independence in their country, the Netanyahu administration should listen and avoid taking actions that threaten Israel's democratic institutions."

Senator Jeff Merkley says that America's "robust, 75-year alliance with Israel is built on a shared commitment to democratic values. Strong, independent institutions — especially the judiciary — are core to a healthy democracy. Concentrating all power in one person or one party is a threat to the rule of law."

Representatives 
Representative Jerry Nadler, ranking member of the House Judiciary Committee, wrote that he is "particularly distressed about the latest reported plans of Israel's new minister of justice to undermine the judiciary and the system of checks and balances. Enacting the Override Clause, stripping legal advisors of their authority, canceling the "reasonableness standard"—all of these proposals undermine the judiciary's authority, which is fundamental to a functioning democracy."

Representative Jamie Raskin, ranking member of the House Oversight Committee, has stated that the Netanyahu government's plan to weaken the Supreme Court would put Israel in the same category as repressive governments that are widely condemned in the global arena. "All over the world liberal democracy is under siege by right-wing autocrats and fanatical extremists who are in a coordinated global attack on freedom," says Raskin. "Fortunately, the forces of strong democracy, judicial independence, human rights and women's equality, religious pluralism and the rule of law are on the march too," he said, adding that "The struggle to defend the separation of powers, judicial independence and the rule of law in Israel is now a significant part of this global defense of democratic freedom against corrupt plutocrats and autocrats hellbent on power at all costs."

Representative Brad Sherman, a member of the House Committee on Foreign Affairs, has said "I see the mistakes the current government is making". He added "[J]udicial review is a good idea. It's good to have basic democratic principles and a Supreme Court that can make sure you adhere to them."

Representative David Cicilline, a member of the House Judiciary Committee, said that "The sweeping judicial overhaul proposal championed by Israel's new far-right government would be catastrophic for the future of Israeli democracy and our shared democratic values. Any attempts to change existing judicial processes must go through a rigorous review process, including building a broad consensus with input from opposition parties and civil society."

Representative Jim McGovern, ranking member of the House Rules Committee and ranking member of the Tom Lantos Human Rights Commission (a bipartisan caucus of the House of Representatives), said that he strongly opposes "Netanyahu's decision to […] gut the independence of the Israeli Supreme Court."

Representative Dan Goldman said that he is "concerned by the new Israeli government's efforts to subvert the independence of the judiciary in a way that undermines Israel's status as a beacon of freedom and democracy." He added "I care deeply and personally about the safety and security of the Israeli state. But part of that safety and security is an unwavering commitment to separation of powers and the rule of law, which must be upheld by a strong and independent judicial branch."

Representative Steve Cohen described the Israeli government's efforts to change the judicial system and the balance of powers in Israel as "a very disturbing and concerning set of events." Netanyahu's coalition, he warned, "is apparently trying to change the judiciary in such a way that the executive and the legislature will have much more control and the independent judiciary will disappear."

Representative Jan Schakowsky says she is "deeply concerned by the far-right's proposal to restrict the independence and powers of Israel's judiciary. I fear it would jeopardize Israeli democracy and undermine the U.S.-Israel relationship." She added "I hope the protesters will be heard and that this plan will be abandoned."

Representative Earl Blumenauer echoes those comments, saying that "a radical overhaul of the judiciary is ill advised and appears to have severe implications for Israel."

Representative Mark DeSaulnier says that he is "deeply concerned by proposals in Israel to undermine its democratic institutions by dramatically overhauling the judicial system."

Representative Melanie Stansbury notes that "across the world, modern democracies depend on systems of checks and balances to ensure the balance of power and ensure that governments remain accountable to their people and the rule of law."

Representative Anna Eshoo warns that "the strength of the U.S.-Israel relationship is rooted in our mutual commitment to democracy. By moving forward with his proposal to gut the Israeli judiciary, Prime Minister Netanyahu is not only jeopardizing Israel's democratic institutions, he is straining the critical relationship between our countries."

Representative Barbara Lee notes that "an impartial, independent judiciary is a vital cornerstone of democracy. I strongly condemn Netanyahu's efforts to politicize Israel's Supreme Court."

Sixteen Jewish Representatives including Jerry Nadler, Brad Schneider, Jamie Raskin, Elissa Slotkin, Debbie Wasserman Schultz and Susan Wild sent a letter to President Herzog, Prime Minister Netanyahu and Opposition Leader Lapid, expressing their "profound concern about [the] proposed changes... [which] could undermine Israeli democracy and the civil rights and religious freedoms it protects."

Others 
Former Mayor of New York City, Michael Bloomberg, warned against damage to Israel's economy, security, and relations with the United States if the reform is passed.

Members of the legal profession 
Prominent US lawyer Alan Dershowitz has said that "he cannot defend sweeping judicial reforms planned by Israel's new government." Dershowitz also said that the move would be a "terrible mistake" and "If I were in Israel I would be joining the protests."

Former Canadian justice minister and attorney general Irwin Cotler has said the legislation proposed by the government would "eviscerate judicial review," "undermine the independence of the judiciary," and "vest undue power" in the government. Cotler also rejected comparisons made by Netanyahu between the proposed reforms and Canada's judicial system, reportedly stating that Canada's override law was created within the framework of a charter of basic rights and freedoms, which Israel lacks, and that some of the most fundamental rights are in any case not subject to the override clause.

Over 190 US/Canadian law professors have signed a statement saying "We, law professors in the United States and Canada who care deeply about Israel, strongly oppose the effort by the current Israeli government to radically overhaul the country's legal system. This effort includes proposed reforms that would grant the ruling coalition absolute power to appoint Justices and judges, make it almost impossible for the Supreme Court to invalidate legislation, severely limit judicial review of executive-branch decisions, and curtail the independence of the Attorney General and legal advisers assigned to different government agencies." The statement says that the signatories do not have a uniform view about the powers of the Israeli Supreme Court, but that they "are all deeply worried that the speed and scale of the reforms will seriously weaken the independence of the judiciary, the separation of powers and the rule of law."

Over 150 Canadian jurists, including former Chief Justice of the Supreme Court Beverley McLachlin, six other former Justices of the Supreme Court, and legal academics and practicing lawyers, published a statement against the reforms, expressing their concern that the changes "will weaken democratic governance, undermine the rule of law, jeopardize the independence of the judiciary, impair the protection of human rights, and diminish the international respect currently accorded to Israeli legal institutions."

Ruvi Ziegler, the programme director for LLMs in International Law, Human Rights and Advanced Legal Studies at the University of Reading, has written that the planned reform:
 "would significantly weaken constitutional review of human rights violations, leaving Israel's already vulnerable minorities subject to the exercise of untrammeled power by a simple coalition majority",
 "undermines the independence of the judiciary by altering a long-standing balanced Judicial Appointment Committee, handing over absolute power to the government of the day",
 "would neuter legal advice given by the civil service",
 "would strip courts of their power to hold the Executive properly accountable for its administrative decisions".
Anthony Julius, one of Britain's most prominent Jewish lawyers, has fiercely attacked the plan for a wholesale overhaul of Israel's judicial system, calling it a "destructive" and "horrible" project designed to turn Israel into a lawless state.

Economists and financial experts 
56 leading US economists, including 11 Nobel Prize laureates, have signed an open letter, stating that "The governing coalition in Israel is considering an array of legislative acts that would weaken the independence of the judiciary and its power to constrain governmental actions. Numerous Israeli economists, in an open letter that some of us joined, expressed concerns that such a reform would adversely affect the Israeli economy by weakening the rule of law and thereby moving Israel in the direction of Hungary and Poland. Although we significantly vary in our views on public policy and on the challenges facing Israeli society, we all share these concerns. A strong and independent judiciary is a critical part of a system of checks and balances. Undermining it would be detrimental not only to democracy but also to economic prosperity and growth."

Former US Treasury secretary Lawrence Summers has said that the current Israeli government's effort to limit the powers of the judiciary appears "overly rapid," could raise "serious and profound questions about the rule of law" and "could have quite serious adverse effects on the Israeli economy."

The OECD warned that the erosion of an independent judiciary would likely lead to negative economic consequences and declining investment in Israel.

Nouriel Roubini warned against damage to the Israel's economy, democracy and security if the reform is allowed to pass.

Credit rating agencies 
Moody's Investor Service stated that the planned judicial reforms could have a negative impact on Israel's sovereign credit rating.

Investors 
Due to the judicial reform plans, American investment bank JPMorgan Chase warned investors of a growing risk of investing in Israel. JPMorgan warned that Israel's credit rating could face negative pressure.

The JPMorgan memo followed a similar warning from HSBC and Goldman Sachs, who wrote in January 2023 that the reforms have "sparked concern among some investors, including locals, that the reforms could reduce judicial independence in Israel, and that — for example, by eventually reducing FDI [foreign direct investment] or tech sector growth in Israel," adding that the judicial reforms could negatively harm the Israeli shekel. These predictions arguably came to fruition on February 21, 2023, when the shekel declined to its weakest level since March 2020, falling more than 2% to a three-year low, and again on March 20, 2023, when the shekel dropped to a four-year low.

Researchers and academics 
Over 140 Israeli and U.S. historians have signed a letter, stating:

 "[The] proposal to politicize the committee that appoints judges will introduce favoritism into the justice system and will call into question the objectivity of judges in all matters.
 The founders of the state of Israel deliberately limited the power of the government. They […] ensured that the judicial system would be apolitical and independent.
 Israel can be likened to a ship sailing the high seas: the state's institutions are the keel that stabilizes the ship as it moves across stormy waters, while the politicians hold the rudder and tilt its course left or right. The current government is taking out the keel, consciously dismantling the state's institutions.
 What we see causes grave alarm. Since its establishment, there has never been a graver political crisis in Israel that poses such an immediate danger to the very existence of the state."
More than 200 prominent Jewish-American scientists, including several Nobel Prize laureates, have come out against the Netanyahu government's judicial overhaul plan. The scientists stated that their longtime support of Israel required them to "speak up vigorously against incipient changes to Israel's core governmental structure, as put forward by Justice Minister [Yariv] Levin, that will eviscerate Israel's judiciary and impede its critical oversight function." Referring to the planned legislation which would allow the Knesset to override Supreme Court decisions by a very slim majority of 61 votes in the 120-seat parliament, the scientists warned that "Such imbalance and unchecked authority invite corruption and abuse, and stifle the healthy interplay of core state institutions," explaining that "history has shown that this leads to oppression of the defenseless and the abrogation of human rights." They stated that "Pluralism, secular and broad education, protection of rights for women and minorities, and societal stability guaranteed by the rule of law" are "non-negotiable virtues" and their abandonment "would provoke a rift with the international scientific community," increase the risk of boycotts and risk causing a "'brain drain' of [Israel's] best scientists and engineers," expressing concern that "the unprecedented erosion of judiciary independence in Israel will set back the Israeli scientific enterprise for generations to come."

Some 500 Israeli researchers, lecturers and physicians, employed in overseas research and education institutions, signed a petition calling on the Israeli government to stop the legislation.

Trade union leaders 
Randi Weingarten, president of the American Federation of Teachers (the largest union in the AFL-CIO labor federation), and Stuart Appelbaum, president of the Retail, Wholesale and Department Store Union and president of the Jewish Labor Committee, have written "We are watching the democracy crisis In Israel with increasing dismay," adding "There are no workers' rights without democracy and no democracy without workers' rights."

Newspaper columns and editorials 
In a New York Times op-ed, conservative columnist Bret Stephens noted Netanyahu's legal complications and "personal interest in bringing the judiciary to heel". He compared him unfavorably to Richard Nixon, stating that "at least there were limits to what the 37th president was willing to do to the system of constitutional government to keep himself in office."

In an article about the planned judicial reforms, Martin Wolf, the chief economics commentator at the Financial Times, wrote that "[T]he reforms are mainly a power grab. They would allow the executive to operate with little judicial accountability and fill the judiciary with […] loyalists."

The Financial Times stated, in an editorial, that "[E]ssential checks on executive excess are under threat from the government of Benjamin Netanyahu through the planned neutering of judicial powers. [...] The reforms would give the government control over judicial appointments, prevent the High Court [...] from striking down any of the country’s quasi-constitutional 'Basic Laws', and limit the court to repealing legislation only if its 15 judges vote unanimously to do so — with a parliamentary override power even in that case with a simple majority. Israel is vulnerable to any weakening of the separation of powers because it has so few checks and balances: it has no written constitution, a president with no veto power, and only one parliamentary chamber, in which the executive almost always holds a majority. This is the context in which a powerful, activist, Supreme Court emerged. It is true that it has sweeping powers, with wide grounds for judicial review of government decisions. Concern about over-reach is legitimate. But curbing it requires considered constitutional reform supported across the political spectrum, not the kind of blatant power grab Netanyahu and his allies are attempting. Giving politicians control over appointments does not depoliticise the bench; it merely pushes the judiciary towards the politics the government of the day favours — in this case, an alarmingly nationalist, religious and hardline one."

New York Times columnist Thomas Friedman asked "what Israeli leader would risk a civil war at home, a breach with Jewish democrats across the world, a break with America and significant damage to Israel’s high-tech miracle — and now open talk by Israeli troops that they will not die to protect a dictatorship... Netanyahu would risk all that only for something very big, very important and very personal. And that is a judicial “reform” that he hopes would end his trial on breach of trust, bribery and fraud charges, which could land him in prison. The judicial “reform” would also give his right-wing coalition the unfettered power to build any settlements in any place, to seize any Palestinian land and to pour tax dollars into Orthodox religious schools where young people have only to study the Torah, not math, science or literature — let alone serve in the army."

Neutral reactions

Jewish organizations

North America

Orthodox Union 
Rabbi Moshe Hauer, Executive Vice President of the Orthodox Union, said that the OU believed that "there should be a dialogue within Israel" regarding the planned judicial reform. He also said that "our way is not through public declarations, but quiet conversations."

Reactions supporting the changes

Members of the legal profession 
American legal scholars Richard A. Epstein and Max Raskin co-authored an op-ed in The Wall Street Journal in support of the reforms and their economic impact. They wrote that “Israel’s Supreme Court … is the branch of government that actually holds unchecked political power” and contrast the situation in the US, where SCOTUS has the “power to strike down laws, but [is] guided by a written constitution” with the situation in Israel, where (in the absence of a Constitution) Supreme Court judges "are guided by their own judgments and the quasi-constitutional 'Basic Laws,' which the Israeli Supreme Court itself can strike down." They unfavorably compare Israel's Judicial Selection Committee to the way in which Supreme Court judges are chosen in the US. Epstein and Raskin argue that the reforms will not have a negative impact on Israel’s economy or credit rating as they “will bring Israel’s judicial systems more in line with Western norms.”

See also
 Thirty-seventh government of Israel
 Human rights in Israel
 Judicial reform
 Rabbinical Court (Israel)

References

Notes

Citations

Further reading

External links
 Supreme Court of Israel

2023 controversies
2023 in Israel
2023 reform
Law of Israel
Benjamin Netanyahu